The 2012 Open GDF Suez was a women's professional tennis tournament played on indoor hard courts. It was the 20th edition of the Open GDF Suez (formerly known as the Open Gaz de France) and was a Premier tournament on the 2012 WTA Tour. It took place at Stade Pierre de Coubertin in Paris, France from 4 February through 12 February 2012.

Singles main-draw entrants

Seeds

1 Rankings as of January 30, 2012

Other entrants
The following players received wildcards into the main draw:
 Alizé Cornet
 Pauline Parmentier

The following players received entry from the qualifying draw:
 Gréta Arn
 Kristina Barrois
 Mona Barthel 
 Bethanie Mattek-Sands

The following players received entry as lucky losers into the singles main draw:
 Alberta Brianti
 Jill Craybas
 Varvara Lepchenko

Withdrawals
  Jelena Janković (left thigh injury)
  Kaia Kanepi (right shoulder injury)
  Sabine Lisicki (viral illness)

Retirements
  Jill Craybas (right leg injury)
  Li Na (lower back injury)

Doubles main-draw entrants

Seeds

1 Rankings are as of January 30, 2012

Other entrants
The following pair received wildcard into the doubles main draw:
  Julie Coin /  Pauline Parmentier

Retirements
  Monica Niculescu (abdominal injury)

Finals

Singles

 Angelique Kerber defeated  Marion Bartoli, 7–6(7–3), 5–7, 6–3
It was Kerber's 1st career title. She became the first German winner at Paris since Steffi Graf in 1995.

Doubles

 Liezel Huber  /  Lisa Raymond defeated  Anna-Lena Grönefeld  /  Petra Martić, 7–6(7–3), 6–1

References

External links
Official website

Open GDF Suez
Open GDF Suez
Open GDF Suez
2012 in Paris
2012 in French tennis